Mark Charles Wiebe (born September 13, 1957) is an American professional golfer who currently plays on the PGA Tour Champions. He also played on the PGA Tour and Nationwide Tour.

Early life
Wiebe was born in Seaside, Oregon and grew up in Escondido, California. He attended Escondido High School from 1972–75, then Palomar College from 1976–77, then San Jose State University from 1978–79, and was a member of the golf team at both institutions. While a student at Palomar, he was the individual medalist at the 1977 California Amateur, won the 1977 Idaho Amateur; and he holds the Palomar school record for low round at 6-under-par (66). He turned pro in 1980 and joined the PGA Tour in 1983.

Professional career
Wiebe has about four dozen top-10 finishes in PGA Tour events including two wins. His first win came in 1985 at the Anheuser-Busch Golf Classic when he beat John Mahaffey with a birdie on the first extra hole of a sudden-death playoff. In 1986, he won the Hardee's Golf Classic and finished 25th on the final money list. Wiebe's best finish in a major was a T-12 at the 1989 PGA Championship. Wiebe was a co-leader after 36 holes with Tom Watson at the 1987 U.S. Open before shooting closing rounds of 77 and 79 to finish tied for 58th.

Wiebe became eligible to join the Champions Tour when he turned 50 in September 2007. He won the first Champions Tour tournament that he played in at the SAS Championship. Wiebe matched Bobby Wadkins as the tour's youngest winner at 50 years and 10 days old.

On July 29, 2013, Wiebe won his maiden senior major at the Senior Open Championship at the Royal Birkdale Golf Club. He defeated Bernhard Langer on the fifth hole of a sudden-death playoff with a par, after both players finished the tournament at nine-under-par. Wiebe began the final round four shots back of Langer, but produced a four-under round of 66 to make the playoff, after Langer had double-bogeyed the final hole of regulation play. Both players parred the first two extra holes before play was halted due to darkness, becoming the first ever Senior Open Championship to have a Monday finish. At the third extra hole, Langer missed a twelve footer for the victory, before Wiebe won at the fifth extra hole with a par, after Langer could not get up and down from a greenside bunker. On September 22, 2013, Wiebe won his second event of the year at the Pacific Links Hawai'i Championship. He defeated Corey Pavin in a sudden-death playoff with a par on the second extra hole.

Personal life
Wiebe lives in Denver, Colorado and is the father of three children. His son, Gunner, qualified for PGA Tour Latinoamérica in 2013.

Amateur wins
1977 California Amateur 
1977 Idaho Amateur
1979 Pacific Northwest Amateur

Professional wins (8)

PGA Tour wins (2)

PGA Tour playoff record (1–2)

Other wins (1)
1986 Colorado Open

Champions Tour wins (5)

Champions Tour playoff record (3–0)

Results in major championships

WD = withdrew
CUT = missed the half-way cut
"T" indicates a tie for a place

Senior major championships

Wins (1)

1 Defeated Langer in a sudden-death playoff with a par at the fifth extra hole

Senior results timeline
Results are not in chronological order prior to 2016.

CUT = missed the halfway cut
WD = withdrew
"T" indicates a tie for a place

See also
1983 PGA Tour Qualifying School graduates
1984 PGA Tour Qualifying School graduates

References

External links

American male golfers
San Jose State Spartans men's golfers
PGA Tour golfers
PGA Tour Champions golfers
Winners of senior major golf championships
Golfers from Oregon
People from Seaside, Oregon
Sportspeople from Escondido, California
Golfers from Denver
1957 births
Living people